Maurits Frederik Hendrik de Haas (December 12, 1832November 23, 1895) was a Dutch-American marine painter. His name has been written as Mauritz Frederik de Haas, Maurice F. H. de Haas, Maurice Frederic Henri de Haas, Mauritz Frederick Hendrick De Haas, "Maurice Frederick Hendrick de Haas", as well as various other variations.

Biography
De Haas was born in Rotterdam, Netherlands. He studied art at the Rotterdam Academy and at The Hague, under Johannes Bosboom and Louis Meyer, and in 1851-1852 in London, following the English watercolourists of the day. In 1857 he received an artist's commission in the Dutch Navy, but in 1859, under the patronage of August Belmont, who had recently been minister of the United States at The Hague, he resigned and moved to New York City.

He became an associate of the National Academy in 1863 and an academician in 1867, and exhibited annually in the academy, and in 1866 he was one of the founders of the American Society of Painters in Water Colors. He died in New York City.

His Farragut Passing the Forts at the Battle of New Orleans and The Rapids above Niagara, which were exhibited at the Paris Exposition of 1878, were his best known but not his most typical works, for his favorite subjects were storm and wreck, wind and heavy surf, and less often moonlight on the coasts of Holland, of Jersey, of New England, Long Island, the English Channel and of Grand Manan island in the Bay of Fundy.

His brother Willem Frederik de Haas (1830–1880) was also a marine painter.

Works
Rocky Coast (unknown)
Sunset off the Needles, 1870; St. Johnsbury Athenaeum, St. Johnsbury, Vermont 
Afternoon on Saco Bay, Coast of Maine, 1874
Hudson River Under Moonlight, 1876
Fishing Boats at Anchor, 1886

Notable students
Archibald Cary Smith

References

1832 births
1895 deaths
19th-century Dutch painters
Dutch male painters
American marine artists
Dutch marine artists
19th-century American painters
American male painters
Realist painters
Landscape artists
Painters from Rotterdam
Dutch emigrants to the United States
People from Grand Manan
19th-century American male artists
19th-century Dutch male artists